Iraq participated in the 16th Asian Games in Guangzhou from 12 November to 27 November 2010.

Medalists

Archery

Women

Athletics

Men 

Track events

Field events

Women 

Track events

Combined events

Badminton

Men

Board games

Chess

Boxing

Cue Sports

Gymnastics

Artistic gymnastics 
Men
Individual Qualification & Team all-around Final

Judo

Men

Karate

Men

Rowing

Men

Swimming

Men

Wrestling

Men
Freestyle

Greco-Roman

References

Nations at the 2010 Asian Games
2010
Asian Games